"I'm Into You" is a song recorded by American singer Jennifer Lopez for her seventh studio album Love? (2011). It features American rapper Lil Wayne, who also co-wrote it alongside British singer-songwriter Taio Cruz and Norwegian musicians Mikkel S. Eriksen and Tor Erik Hermansen. The latter two also produced the song, credited as Stargate. A mid-tempo pop and R&B song, it depicts Lopez about being lost in love, while Lil Wayne's verses interject clever wordplay. The song was originally due for release as a promotional single in the US and Canada on April 5, 2011, but was unlocked and released in those markets four days earlier on April 1, 2011, through a campaign on Lopez's Facebook page. The song was later serviced to rhythmic and urban radio on April 26, 2011, as the second single from Love?.

"I'm Into You" received generally positive reviews from contemporary music critics, who complimented the song's catchy hook, island-flavored production and playful lyrics. The song reached number one in Greece and Lebanon, number 41 on the US Billboard Hot 100, topped the Billboard Hot Dance Club Songs chart, and reached the top ten on the UK Singles Chart. The music video for "I'm Into You" began production in Chichen Itza, Mexico on April 2, 2011, and was released on May 2, 2011, at Today. The video depicts the singer on a Mayan pyramid, as well as on a beach with her love interest; she also dances with two other dancers. The video received critical acclaim, praising her dance skill and beauty.

Background
Following the commercial and critical failure of her sixth studio album Brave (2007) and while pregnant with twins Max and Emme, Lopez began working on new music for a future project in 2008. The project was kept under wraps until February 2009 when a new song from the recording sessions titled "Hooked on You" leaked online. Lopez addressed the leak on her official website in May 2009, stating that "I'm always excited about my music and this ["Hooked on You"] is one of a few tracks I'm currently working on. I'm flattered by everyone's interest in the track and really excited for you to hear the real thing..." Following the leak of "Hooked on You", "One Love" and "What Is Love?" (later re-titled "(What Is) Love?") were subsequently leaked online in May. The leaked songs were, at the time, meant to appear on a greatest hits album; that later turned into a studio album. The following month, Lopez told MTV's Larry Carol that the songs hinted at the musical direction of her then-upcoming seventh studio album. She also stated that she was keen to finish the album and several singles, with a potential release date for the end of 2009.

Lopez released "Louboutins", a song written and produced by The-Dream and Tricky Stewart, as the project's lead single in November 2009. However, upon release, the song failed to garner enough airplay to chart, despite topping the US Billboard Hot Dance Club Songs chart. Lopez subsequently left Epic Records in February 2010, citing that she had fulfilled her contractual obligations and now wished to release Love? under a new label. Her departure from the label temporarily halted production on the album, however upon signing a new contract with Island Records, recording resumed on the album. The New York Daily News revealed that Lopez would be taking some of the records recorded under Sony Music Entertainment to her new label so that they could be included on the album.

Lopez released her first single with the label "On the Floor" featuring American rapper Pitbull in February 2011. The song topped the charts across the globe; peaking at number three on the US Billboard Hot 100, her highest-peaking song on that chart in over eight years. The song became one of the most successful singles of the year. The song was well received by critics, who compared it to Lopez's 1999 singles "If You Had My Love" and "Waiting for Tonight". During an online chat with fans in March 2011, Lopez revealed that she was considering releasing "I'm Into You", featuring her favorite male rapper Lil Wayne, as the album's second single.

On March 30, 2011, Lopez appeared on Ryan Seacrest's morning radio show On Air with Ryan Seacrest. There, she spoke about the upcoming release of her seventh studio album Love?, and her American Idol experiences. She also introduced a thirty-second preview of her new single "I'm Into You". Later that same day, the full song was leaked online. The song was used in a promotional campaign in North America on Lopez's Facebook page. If enough fans "liked" the song, it would be "unlocked" for early purchase on the iTunes Store. On April 1, the song was released to the iTunes Store in North America, four days earlier than planned in those markets. The song was then sent to rhythmic and urban airplay in the United States on April 26, 2011, as the second single from Love?. "I'm Into You" was solicited to contemporary hit radio stations in the United States on June 12, 2011.

Music and lyrics

"I'm Into You" is a midtempo pop and R&B song, with a length of three minutes and twenty seconds (3:20). The song was written by Taio Cruz, Lil Wayne and Stargate (Mikkel S. Eriksen and Tor Erik Hermansen), who also produced the song. The song features a guest rap from Lil Wayne, who Lopez cited as being her favorite male rapper at the time. Lopez's vocals for the song were recorded and produced by Kuk Harrell, with additional recording from Jim Annunziato, Josh Gudwin and Chris "TEK" O'Ryan at Roc the Mic Studios in New York City and Westlake Recording in Los Angeles. Lil Wayne's rap was recorded by Mike "Banger" Cadahia, with assistance from Elizabeth Gallardo. Eriksen handled audio engineering of "I'm Into You", alongside Miles Walker with additional engineering from Damien Lewis. The song was later mixed by Phil Tan with the assistance of Lewis at Ninja Club Studios in Atlanta, Georgia.

"I'm Into You" is built around a "trippy" and "synth-heavy beat" and "beachy feel" with a "club-ready refrain," according to Mary Kinney from AOL Music. Kinney commented about Lil Wayne's verses, describing lines like "I'm falling for you, baby / I need a parachute" as clever wordplay. According to Rap-Up, on the song, Lopez "finds herself lost in love" and her lover's attraction. The song's "lithesome beat" is pitched "somewhere between Puerto Rican reggaeton and Jamaican dancehall". "I'm Into You" is built around a "na-na-na" hook, that has received similarities to Rihanna's "What's My Name?". "I'm Into You" is a "Jamaica-meets-Latin late-night summer jam that is both bang-on-trend and worryingly infectious. The result is the Pina Colada of pop songs - smooth, fruity and beautifully presented...but with a surprising amount of kick." "I'm Into You" follows the "pop blueprint"; "layering sparkling synths over sharply bouncing, island tinged percussion" and a "dance floor friendly bass line".

Critical reception
"I'm Into You" received positive reviews. Mary Kinney of AOL Music praised the song's "unstoppable production", stating that: "The hook of Lopez repeating 'I'm into you' will be ringing in listeners' ears long after the song is over, and Lil Wayne provides clever wordplay... The club-ready refrain challenges the listener to not sing along. This song is bound for greatness". Bradley Wete from Entertainment Weekly agreed, further commenting that Lopez is at "her perfect pitch. Her notoriously thin voice never strains–which is great for critical ears." Robbie Daw of Idolator said that although the beat is sparse and the lyrics are borderline simplistic, "the melodies (particularly the irresistible chorus) and Jennifer's warm vocals give this uplifting piece of pop an extra boost".

Scott Shetler of PopCrush called the song one of the standout tracks on Love?, possessing "one of the most memorable and infectious hooks on the record". Jody Rosen of Rolling Stone said that although the song "should be a hot summer single", the song's lyrics are "painfully insipid, and the bland singsong tune fails to work its way into your mind's ear." He concluded by stating that: "Even Weezy, sounding as irrepressible as ever, can't coax any pep out of the desultory J. Lo". Sal Cinquemani of Slant Magazine praised the song, calling it a "summer-hit-in-the-making" with a "sexy island vibe and the kind of 'na-na-na' hook Rihanna has built an entire career around". Poppy Reid of The Music Network criticized the song for its reliance on autotune and lyrics "you just don't expect (or want) from a 41-year-old".

Chart performance

"I'm Into You" debuted at number 72 on the US Billboard Hot 100 chart for the issue dated May 21, 2011. It eventually reached a peak of 41 on August 21, 2011, and stayed on the chart for total of 13 weeks. Thus it became Lopez's sixteenth top-forty song on the chart. "I'm Into You" debuted at number 36 on the US Pop Songs chart for the issue dated July 9, 2011. The next week the single jumped to number 31 and eventually reached its peak of 19 on August 12, 2011. "I'm Into You" entered the US Hot Dance Club Songs chart at number 31 for the issue dated June 4, 2011. The next week it rose to number 19 and eventually topped the chart for the issue dated July 23, 2011; the single stayed on the chart for total of 11 weeks. "I'm Into You" was certified gold by the Recording Industry Association of America (RIAA) for selling more than 500,000 digital copies. The song entered the Canadian Hot 100 chart at number 61 on April 23, 2011, but the next week it fell off the chart. On May 21, 2011, it re-entered the chart at number 79 and eventually reached a peak of 55. It was certified gold by Music Canada after 40,000 downloads of the song were sold.

In Australia, "I'm Into You" debuted at number 47 on the singles chart. The next week the song reached its peak of 45 and stayed on the chart for total of four weeks. It was more successful in South Korea where it reached number six on the International Gaon Chart with sales of 28,539 digital copies for the week. In Europe, "I'm Into You" reached the top-ten in nine countries. The single debuted at number 40 on the UK Singles Chart on May 14, 2011. After five weeks on the chart it reached its peak at number nine on June 18, 2011. "I'm Into You" became Lopez fifteenth top-ten single in the UK. It also charted on the UK R&B Chart where it reached a peak of three. The song debuted at number 47 in Switzerland on May 22, 2011. After five weeks on the chart it reached a peak of 22 and was certified gold by International Federation of the Phonographic Industry (IFPI) - Switzerland for selling over 15,000 digital copies. It was more successful in Norway, where it debuted at its peak of nine and stayed on the chart for total of three weeks. In Italy "I'm Into You" peaked at number 14 and was certified gold by Federation of the Italian Music Industry (FIMI) after 15,000 digital copies of the song were sold.

Music video

Background
The music video for "I'm Into You" was directed by Melina Matsoukas. Lopez shot the video's main scenes in Chichen Itza, Mexico in early April 2011. Additional scenes with Lil Wayne were shot on April 21 in Los Angeles. Throughout its production, Lopez shared multiple photos from the video shoot with her fans through social networking website Twitter. US Weekly reported that scenes were filmed at different locations around a Mayan archaeological site. During one of the scenes shot at night, the ancient columns were lit for Lopez to dance around. At its three-minute mark, the video switches to a dance-breakdown to the song "Papi" where Lopez is backed by two female dancers. Rap-Up released two images from the shoot, and wrote: "A tatted Weezy leaned his back against People's Most Beautiful Woman in the World in the first images from the set." Telenovela star and model William Levy was cast as Lopez's love interest for the video. Lopez explained to Extra how she found the Cuban actor: "I called my cousins and I said 'Who's the hottest guy right now?' and they're like William Levy! And I was like, 'Okay, let's get William Levy!"

The video aired on NBC's Today on May 2, 2011. Although Lil Wayne was pictured filming scenes with Lopez, on green-screen, in Los Angeles, he does not appear in the version of the video premiered on Today. A version featuring the rapper was uploaded to Lopez's official Vevo on May 9, 2011. It is nearly identical to the first version, but features additional scenes where Lil Wayne appears alone against a dimly lit yellow backdrop.

Synopsis

The music video begins with Lopez looking radiant as she frolics on the beach with her telenovela male co-star William Levy. Wearing a bejeweled dress, Lopez sings alongside her co-star in a flash of color and black-and-white shots. The clip features the seductive singer atop the historical steps of the Chichen Itza. In one scene, Lopez is sat on the steps of Kukulkán's pyramid, dressed in a snakeskin outfit with a headwrap, matching bangles, and platform wedge heels. Along with the song's midtempo beat, "I'm Into You" also features an unexpected dance breakdown, where Lopez bursts into some swift choreography to a clip of her song "Papi". Another version of the video was later released, intercut with scenes featuring Lil' Wayne. Lopez is seen flaunting her body around ancient Mesopotamian Ziggurats.

Reception
Robert Copsey from Digital Spy gave a positive review for the video, enjoying the beach part, which according to him, is "reminiscent of her 'Love Don't Cost a Thing' video" and praising the dance breakdown, which included, according to him, "a wonderfully choreographed breakdown moment", featuring new album track 'Papi'. Dennis Pastorizo of the website Terra USA was impressed with the video, saying that: "Jennifer Lopez looks smokin' hot-heck-I dare to say, better than ever in the video." Ann Lee from the UK website Metro said that: "watching Jennifer Lopez's video for I'm Into You is like going on a summer holiday." She also thought that "Lopez tries her best to be as sexy as possible." Becky Bain of the website Idolator was also positive, saying that: "it's the perfect vid to welcome the Summer season." Eliot Glazer from MTV Buzzworthy positively said that: "Ms. Lopez still looks just as good! It's like she's aging in reverse." Erika Ramirez wrote for Billboard that "Lopez roll around white sand with her on-screen Latin beau and rock a short dance number. J.Lo's still got it! (Never doubted it.)"

Live performances
Lopez was initially set to perform "I'm Into You" for the first time during an episode of American Idol on May 5, 2011, but didn't end up following through with it. In June, Lopez was the headlining act for the 2011 Summertime Ball at Wembley Stadium for a crowd of 75,000; "I'm Into You" was included on her setlist. Lopez performed "I'm Into You" during her appearance on the British chat show  Alan Carr: Chatty Man on June 17, 2011. The song subsequently rose to number nine on the UK Singles Chart as a result of her performance. The song was included on the setlist for her Dance Again World Tour, which ran from June to December 2012. During the performance, Lil Wayne's parts of the song appeared in a clip which was displayed on the big screen.

Track listing
Digital download – single
"I'm Into You" (feat. Lil Wayne) – 3:54

Digital download – "I'm Into You" Remixes
"I'm Into You" (Dave Audé Radio) – 3:54
"I'm Into You" (Low Sunday I'm Into You Radio) – 4:07
"I'm Into You" (Gregor Salto Hype Radio) – 3:20
"I'm Into You" (Dave Audé Club) – 7:01
"I'm Into You" (Low Sunday I'm Into You Club) – 6:25
"I'm Into You" (Gregor Salto Hype Club) – 5:10
"I'm Into You" (Dave Audé Dub) – 7:08
"I'm Into You" (Low Sunday I'm Into You Dub) – 6:25
"I'm Into You" (Gregor Salto Hype Dub) – 5:12

Credits and personnel
Adapted from the album credits.

Personnel

Jim Annunziato –  vocal recording
Mike "Banger" Cadahia – vocal recording (Lil Wayne's vocals)
Dwayne Carter (Lil Wayne) – featured rap vocals, songwriter
Taio Cruz – songwriter
Mikkel S. Eriksen – songwriter, producer (alongside Hermansen, credited as Stargate), recording engineer, instruments
Elizabeth Gallardo – assistant vocal recording (Lil Wayne's vocals)

Josh Gudwin – vocal recording
Jennifer Lopez – lead vocals
Kuk Harrell – vocal producer, vocal recording, vocal editing
Tor E. Hermansen – songwriter, producer (alongside Eriksen, credited as Stargate), instruments
Damien Lewis – additional audio mixer, assistant engineer
Chris "TEK" O'Ryan – vocal recording
Jeanette Olsson – background vocals
Phil Tan – audio mixer
Miles Walker – recording engineer

Charts

Weekly charts

Year-end charts

Certifications

Release history

See also
 List of number-one dance singles of 2011 (U.S.)

References

2011 singles
2011 songs
Jennifer Lopez songs
Lil Wayne songs
Song recordings produced by Stargate (record producers)
Island Records singles
Number-one singles in Greece
Songs written by Taio Cruz
Songs written by Tor Erik Hermansen
Songs written by Mikkel Storleer Eriksen
Songs written by Lil Wayne
Music videos directed by Melina Matsoukas
Song recordings produced by Kuk Harrell